Kadriye Ahmed Hulusi Hacıbulgur (7 November 1905 – 13 August 1988) was a Turkish Cypriot politician. In 1960 she was elected to the Turkish Communal Chamber, becoming the first woman elected to a legislative body in Cyprus.

Biography
Hulusi was born in Famagusta in 1905. She attended  and went on to work as a teacher for 37 years, becoming a headteacher. Her pupils included Rauf Denktaş and Osman Örek.

In the 1960 parliamentary elections Hulusi was a Cyprus Turkish National Union candidate for the Turkish Communal Chamber, and was the only woman elected to either Communal Chamber or the House of Representatives. She remained in office until 1970.

She died in August 1988. In 1996 she was featured on stamps of Northern Cyprus celebrating famous European women.

References

1905 births
People from Famagusta
Cypriot schoolteachers
20th-century Cypriot women politicians
20th-century Cypriot politicians
Members of the Communal Chambers
Cyprus Turkish National Union politicians
1988 deaths